Holmes Lake is a Canadian lake in Northumberland County, New Brunswick.

Holmes Lake is one of several large lakes forming the headwaters of the Little Southwest Miramichi River.  It was named in 1884 for the first lumberman who had worked the area

The lake was long the exclusive fishery of the Pratt family of New York.  After being introduced to the area by longtime guide Henry A. Braithwaite, George Dupont Pratt constructed the log camps at the lake in 1909. Ownership of the camps later passed to his son Sherman Pratt, co-founder of Marineland.

The Pratt family leased the fishing rights on this lake and the headwaters of the Little Southwest Miramichi River from the provincial government.  Sherman Pratt was the founder of the Grenville Baker Boys Club (of Locust Valley, New York), and allowed the  use of the Pratt Camp as a summer camp for its members, approximately thirty boys each summer.

See also
List of lakes of New Brunswick

References

Lakes of New Brunswick
Landforms of Northumberland County, New Brunswick